The 1983 Alabama Crimson Tide football team (variously "Alabama", "UA", "Bama" or "The Tide") represented the University of Alabama in the 1983 NCAA Division I-A football season. It was the Crimson Tide's  
92nd overall and 50th season as a member of the Southeastern Conference (SEC). The team was led by head coach Ray Perkins, in his first year, and played their home games at both Bryant–Denny Stadium in Tuscaloosa and Legion Field in Birmingham, Alabama. They finished the season with a record of eight wins and four losses (8–2 overall, 4–1 in the SEC). Ray Perkins, who played as a wide receiver for Bear Bryant in the 1960s, was named as the new head coach at Alabama on December 14, 1982, to succeed Bryant after his 26-year tenure as Alabama's head coach.

After opening the season with four consecutive wins and rising to #3 in the AP poll, The Tide suffered a controversial 34–29 loss to Penn State. Trailing 34-6 entering the 4th quarter, Alabama rallied and seemed to be an extra point away from victory after tight end Preston Gothard appeared to catch a game-tying 
touchdown pass with eight seconds left in the game. One official signaled a touchdown but was overruled by the back judge who ruled Gothard was out of bounds. Video replay indicated otherwise, however instant replay in college football was still decades away. Bama avenged the previous year's losses to LSU and Southern Miss but lost to Tennessee and Auburn again. The Crimson Tide completed their season with a 28–7 victory over SMU in the Sun Bowl.

Schedule

References
General

 

Specific

Alabama
Alabama Crimson Tide football seasons
Sun Bowl champion seasons
Alabama Crimson Tide football